The 1956 Kilkenny Senior Hurling Championship was the 62nd staging of the Kilkenny Senior Hurling Championship since its establishment by the Kilkenny County Board.

On 26 August 1956, Bennettsbridge won the championship after a 2-08 to 3-03 defeat of John Locke's in the final. It was their fifth championship title overall and their second title in succession.

Results

Final

References

Kilkenny Senior Hurling Championship
Kilkenny Senior Hurling Championship